Marko Jagodić-Kuridža (born May 15, 1987) is a Serbian professional basketball player for Budućnost VOLI of the ABA League and the Prva A Liga. He also represents the senior Serbian national basketball team internationally.

He won national titles with Cibona, Nymburk, Oostende, Primorska, Budućnost and Crvena zvezda as well as two ABA League titles.

Professional career 
Jagodić-Kuridža was born in Zadar, present-day Croatia, but grew up in Požega, Serbia. He started his senior career with Spartak Subotica. He then played for Novi Sad of the Basketball League of Serbia. He also played for Borac Banja Luka. While playing with  Čapljina Lasta he was named the MVP of the 2011–12 Basketball Championship of Bosnia and Herzegovina.

In July 2012, he signed with Croatian club Cibona. He was the first Serbian basketball player that signed with Cibona after the Yugoslav wars. In his first season with Cibona he won the Croatian League and Cup. In his second year he won the 2013–14 ABA League. On January 1, 2016, after three and a half years in Cibona, he moved to the Czech side ČEZ Nymburk. While playing with Nymburk he won the Czech League. His next club was Oostende where he played two seasons, twice winning the Belgian League and Cup. 

On 20 June 2018, he signed for Slovenian team Primorska. While playing with Primorska in the 2018–19 season, Jagodić-Kuridža won the ABA League Second Division as well the all three trophies in Slovenia (League, Cup and Supercup). He also started the 2019–20 season with Primorska, winning the one more Slovenian Supercup. He was named the Finals MVP of the 2018–19 ABA League Second Division.

On 19 December 2019, he left Primorska and signed with Crvena zvezda. In February 2021, he won the Serbian Cup and was also named the Serbian Cup MVP. With Crvena zvezda he also won the ABA League and the Serbian League. On 24 June 2021, he signed a one-year deal with Budućnost. In July 2022, he re-signed with Budućnost for one more season.

National team career 
In November 2021, Jagodić-Kuridža made his debut for the Serbian national basketball team during the game vs Latvia in the  2023 FIBA Basketball World Cup qualification. He was on the final roster of Serbia for the EuroBasket 2022.

References

External links

 Marko Jagodić-Kuridža at aba-liga.com
 Marko Jagodić-Kuridža at euroleaguebasketball.net
 Marko Jagodić-Kuridža at realgm.com

1987 births
Living people
ABA League players
Basketball players from Zadar
Croatian expatriate basketball people in Serbia
BC Oostende players
Basketball Nymburk players
KK Budućnost players
KK Cibona players
KK Crvena zvezda players
KK Novi Sad players
KK Spartak Subotica players
OKK Borac players
Serbian expatriate basketball people in Belgium
Serbian expatriate basketball people in Bosnia and Herzegovina
Serbian expatriate basketball people in Croatia
Serbian expatriate basketball people in Montenegro
Serbian expatriate basketball people in the Czech Republic
Serbian expatriate basketball people in Slovenia
Serbian men's basketball players
Serbia men's national basketball team players
Serbs of Croatia
Power forwards (basketball)
Yugoslav Wars refugees